Ivan O'Konnel-Bronin (born 10 February 1973) is a retired Estonian football forward, who became a football manager after his professional career. He played for several clubs in his native country, including JK Merkuur Tartu, FC Levadia Tallinn, JK Tammeka Tartu, JK Viljandi Tulevik and FC Ajax Lasnamäe.

International career
O'Konnel-Bronin earned his first official cap for the Estonia national football team on 30 July 1994, when Estonia played Latvia at the Baltic Cup 1994. He obtained a total of 22 caps.

References

External links

1973 births
Living people
Sportspeople from Tartu
Estonian footballers
Estonia international footballers
Association football forwards
Viljandi JK Tulevik players
FC Ajax Lasnamäe players
FC Norma Tallinn players
FCI Levadia Tallinn players
Estonian people of Irish descent
Meistriliiga players
JK Maag Tartu players